Acantholycosa spinembolus is a species of wolf spiders only known from the Kholzun Mountain Range in the Russian part of the  Altai Mountains.

This is a dark-coloured spider up to 7.5 mm in length. The carapace and  abdomen are plain and unmarked but the legs have distinctive pale rings. This species can only be distinguished from its closest congeners by details of the genitalia.

References

Lycosidae
Spiders described in 2003
Spiders of Russia